PUO may refer to:

 Ksingmul language, by ISO-639 code
 Princeton University Orchestra
 Pyrexia or fever of unknown origin

See also
 può is the Italian word for "he/she/it can", and it occurs in the title of books, films and songs.